Zlín Film Festival, also known as the International Film Festival for Children and Youth is an annual festival of children's film in Zlín in the Czech Republic. Founded in 1961 in the former Czechoslovakia, the festival gradually gained international attention. The audience consists mainly of children and youth from the Zlín region, but also university students and adult visitors who come to late-night screenings with appropriate dramaturgy, as well as film professionals from around the world.

The anniversary 60th Zlín Film Festival took place exceptionally in September 2020.

History 

The establishment of a regular film festival in Zlín was the result of efforts by local filmmakers to present their work in a local atmosphere. The first festival took place in 1961, 20 years after a previous film festival had been held in Zlín, named Film Harvest or Zliennale. Film Harvest, held in the war years 1940–41, attracted most of the stars of that period's highly productive and internationally successful Czech and Slovak films. The main program was held in Zlín's Grand Cinema, the largest cinema in Central Europe at that time. The capacity of the building, completed in 1932, was over 2,500. The Grand Cinema is still open today, and hosts the opening ceremony of the festival.

In 1936, entrepreneur Jan Antonín Baťa founded a new film studio in the city, which gradually turned into Czechoslovakia's most prominent centre of filmmaking focused on children and youth. Film-makers such as Karel Zeman, Hermína Týrlová, Alexandr Hackenschmied, Břetislav Pojar and Josef Pinkava created their works in the Zlín film studios. The town's film-making tradition continues today in its two film schools.

Programme 

The competitive sections of the festival include new films shot within the last two years. They are accompanied by films from other festivals and classic works of world cinema. Apart from the five competitive sections, the festival includes a number of informative and retrospective sections, including full-length documentary films. Each year the cinematography of one European nation showcased.

Competition Sections 
International Competition of Feature Films in the Children's Category 
International Competition of Feature Films in the Junior Category (over 11 years of age) 
International Competition of Feature Films in the Youth Category (over 15 years of age) 
International Competition of Short Animations for Children (up to 12 year of age) 
Competition of European Documentary Films for Young Audience 
Zlín Dog - International Competition of Student Films

Out-of-competition Sections 
New Czech Film and TV Programmes: Presentation of Czech cinema and TV production from the year.
Panorama: Informative section – presents mostly films awarded at other festivals which cannot compete in one of the competitive sections.
Young Stars  Films introducing young actors whom the audience can meet in person in Zlín.
Limited thematic section Discover and Explore (2019) - nature, people, countries, 2020: Back to the Future (2020) - science, technology, special film effects, Literature in Film (2021) - film adaptation of the well-known books for young audience

Supporting program 

Apart from the film projections, the festival offers a supporting programme of charity and entertainment, including concerts, exhibitions, public readings, and parties. The specialist part of the programme includes mostly classes, lectures and workshops. The festival also includes a supporting programme for the Film Industry.

One festival project is the Cinematrain, a railway car modified into a projection room that travels around the Czech Republic and Slovakia for a few weeks before the film festival. The festival is also the annual end of the Minisalon project - an auction of artistically rendered film. Czech artists and other celebrities design these film clapperboards during the autumn and winter. The collection of art works is then displayed and auctioned off during the film festival. The funds raised from their auction go to support student film productions.

Awards 

Golden Slipper – Main prize awarded to the best feature film in the children´s, junior, youth and animation section.
Karel Zeman Award - Special Recognition for Best Visual Concept in a Feature Film in the Children's Category
Hermína Týrlová Award for Best Short Animation for Children up to 6 Years of Age
Main Prize of the Children's Jury for Best Feature Film in the Children's Category
Main Prize of the Youth Jury for Best Feature Film in the Junior and Youth Category
Zlín Dog Award for Best Student Film (with prize money of EUR 1000)
Europe Award - the European Children's Film Association Award for Best European Documentary Film for Young Audience
Ecumenical Jury Award
Golden Apple – the City of Zlín Audience Award for Best Feature Film in the Children's, Junior and Youth Category
ČT: D Audience Award for Best Short Animation for Children

Winners 
2021| 61st ed.
Golden Slipper for Best Feature Film in the Children’s Category: Sisters: The Summer We Found Our Superpowers, dir. Arild Østin Ommundsen, Silje Salomonsen, Norway
Golden Slipper for Best Feature Film in the Junior Category: Sun Children, dir. Majid Majidi, Iran
Golden Slipper for Best Feature Film in the Youth Category: Valentina, dir. Cássio Pereira dos Santos, Brazil
Golden Slipper for Best Short Animation for Children: Sounds between the Crowns, dir. Filip Diviak, Czech Republic
Europe Award - the European Children's Film Association Award for Best European Documentary Film for Young Audience: Kids Cup, dir. Line Hatland, Denmark, Finland, Norway
Zlín Dog Award for Best Student Film: Yuwol : The Boy Who Made The World Dance, dir. BEFF, South Korea
Golden Apple – the City of Zlín Audience Award for Best Feature Film in the Children's, Junior and Youth Category: Martin and the Magical Forest, dir. Petr Oukropec, Czech Republic, Germany, Slovakia

2020| 60th ed.
Best feature film for children: The Crossing, dir. Johanne Helgeland, Norway
Best feature film for youth: Life without Sara Amat, dir. Lara Jou, Spain
Best short animation for children: The Bird & the Whale, dir. Carol Freeman, Ireland
Best European first film: Nevia, dir. Nunzia De Stefano, Italy
Best European documentary for children: Forward, dir. Gilles de Maistre, France
Best student film: The Last Children in Paradise, dir. Anna Roller, Germany

2019| 59th ed.
Best feature film for children: My Extraordinary Summer with Tess, dir. Steven Wouterlood, Netherlands, Germany
Best feature film for youth: Giant Little Ones, dir. Keith Behrman, Canada
Best short animation for children: Cloudy, dir. Filip Diviak, Zuzana Čupová, Czech Republic
Best European first film: The Unpromised Land, dir. Victor Lindgren, Sweden
Best European documentary for children: How Big Is the Galaxy?, dir. Ksenia Elyan, Estonia, Russia
Best student film: Provence, dir. Kato De Boeck, Belgium

2018| 58th ed.
Best feature film for children: Supa Modo, dir. Likarion Wainaina, Kenya, Germany
Best feature film for youth: Barley Fields on the Other Side of the Mountain, dir. Tian Tsering, United Kingdom
Best short animation for children: Blueberry Hunt, dir. Kateřina Karhánková, Alexandra Májová, Czech Republic
Best European first film: The Best of All Worlds, dir. Adrien Goiginger, Austria
Best student film: Leave of Absence, dir. Moshe Rosenthal, Israel
Best European documentary for children: Wilder Than Wilderness, dir. Marián Polák, Czech Republic

2017| 57th ed.
Best feature film for children: Mountain Miracle – The Unexpected Friendship, dir. Tobias Wiemann , Germany, Italy
Best feature film for youth: Just Charlie, dir. Rebekah Fortune, United Kingdom
Best short animation for children: Two Trams, dir. Svetlana Andrianova, Russia
Best European first film: Heartstone, dir. Guðmundur Arnar Guðmundsson, Iceland
Best student film: Shujayya, dir. Mohammed Almughanni, Poland, Palestina

2016| 56th ed.
Best feature film for children: The World of Us, dir. Yoon Ga-eun , South Korea
Best feature film for youth: Keeper, dir. Guillaume Senez, Belgium, Switzerland, France
Best short animation for children: The Orchestra, dir. Mikey Hill, Australia
Best European first film: Rag Union, dir. Mikhail Mestetskyi, Russia
Best student film: Peacock, dir. Ondřej Hudeček, Czech Republic

2015| 55th ed.
Best feature film for children: Birds of Passage, dir. Olivier Ringer, Belgium
Best feature film for youth: Behavior, dir. Ernesto Daranas, Cuba
Best short animation for children: The Elephant and the Bicycle, dir. Olesya Shchukina, France, Belgium

2014| 54th ed.
Best feature film for children: The Nightingale, dir. Philippe Muyl, France, China
Best feature film for youth: The Kings of Summer, dir. Jordan Vogt-Roberts, U.S.A.
Best Animated Film: Mythopolis, dir. Alexandra Hetmerová, Czech Republic 

2013| 53rd ed.
Best feature film for children: My Sweet Orange Tree, dir. Marcos Bernstein, Brazil
Best Feature Film for Youth: So Much Water, dir. Ana Guevara Pose, Uruguay, Mexico, Netherlands, Germany
Best Animated Film: Pilipka, dir. Tatiana Kublitskaya, Belarus  

2012| 52nd ed.
Best feature film for children: Chubby Drums, dir. Arne Toonen, Netherlands
Best Feature Film for Youth:Death of a Superhero, dir. Ian Fitzgibbon, Germany, Ireland
Best Animated Film:Harbor Tale, dir. Yuichi Ito, Japan

2011| 51st ed.
Best feature film for children: The Liverpool Goalie, dir. Arild Andresen, Norway
Best feature film for youth: Hold Me Tight, dir. Kaspar Munk, Denmark
Best animated film: Larghetto, dir. Jaroslav Nykl, Czech Republic

2010| 50th ed.
Best feature film for children: Magic Tree, dir. Andrzej Maleszka, Poland
Best feature film for youth: Sebbe, dir. Babak Najafi, Sweden
Best animated film: Lost and Found, dir. Philip Hunt, United Kingdom

2009| 49th ed.
Best feature film for children: Who Is Afraid of the Wolf?, dir. Mária Procházková, Czech Republic
Best feature film for youth: Max Embarrassing, dir. Lotte Svendsen, Denmark
Best animated film: Post!, dir. Christian Asmussen, Matthias Bruhn, Germany

2008 | 48th ed.
Best feature film for children: Where Is Winky's Horse?, dir. Mischa Kamp, The Netherlands, Belgium
Best feature film for youth: The Substitute, dir. Ole Bornedal, Denmark
Best animated film: The Bears Stories, dir. Marina Karpova, Russia

2007 | 47th ed.
Best feature film for children: Little Heroes, directed by Itai Lev, Israel
Best feature film for youth: Hoppet, dir. Petter Næss, Sweden
Best animated film: Tyger, dir. Guilherme Marcondes, Brazil

2006 | 46th ed.
Best feature film for children: Bonkers, directed by Martin Koolhoven, The Netherlands
Best feature film for youth: We Shall Overcome, dir. Niels Arden Oplev, Denmark
Best animated film: Cartoon, dir. Pál Tóth, Hungary

2005 | 45th ed.
Best feature film for children: The Color of Milk, directed by Torun Lian, Norway
Best feature film for youth: Fourteen Sucks, dir. Filippa Freijd, Martin Jern, Emil Larsson, Henrik Norrthon, Sweden
Best animated film: Music Shop, dir. Sofia Kravtsova, Russia

2004 | 44th ed.
Best feature film for children: Strong as a Lion, directed by Manne Lindwall, Sweden
Best feature film for youth: 4th Floor, dir. Antonio Mercero, Spain
Best animated film: Music Shop, dir. Michéle Lemieux, Canada

2003 | 43rd ed.
Best feature film for children: The Flying Classroom, directed by Tomy Wigand, Germany
Best feature film for youth: White Oleander, dir. Peter Kosminsky, Germany, USA
Best animated film: I Want a Dog, dir. Sheldon Cohen, Canada

2002 | 42nd ed.
Best feature film for children: Children of Petroleum, directed by Ebrahim Forouzesh, Iran
Best feature film for youth: And Your Mother Too, dir. Alfonso Cuarón, Mexico, USA
Best animated film: Choo-choo-2, dir. Garri Bardine, Russia

References

External links 
 Zlín International Film Festival for Children and Youth – Official website
 Zlínfest – the Czech Republic's most audience-friendly film festival – Czech Radio

Children's film festivals
Film festivals in the Czech Republic
Zlín
1961 establishments in Czechoslovakia
Film festivals established in 1961